Aurora High School may refer to,

In Canada 
Aurora High School (Ontario), Aurora, Ontario

In the United States 
Aurora Central High School, Aurora, Colorado
Aurora Alternative High School (Indiana), Bloomington, Indiana
Aurora High School (Nebraska), Aurora, Nebraska
Aurora High School (Ohio), Aurora, Ohio
Aurora High School (California), Calexico, California
 West Aurora High School, Aurora, Illinois